This article shows the team roster of all participating teams at the 2022 V-League Collegiate Challenge.

Men's division

Pool A

Adamson Soaring Falcons
Head Coach: George Pascua

1 Alegre, Grant Carlo 
2 Canlas, Lorence 
4 Takeda, Jhon Maru 
5 Mirador, Aaron  (c)
6 Pacquing, Ned Calvert 
7 Gudoy, Jadewin 
8 Coguimbal, Mark Leo 
9 De Lare, Mar Angelo  
10 Canlas, Francis 
11 Tropia, JM 
12 Paulino, Marc Kenneth 
13 Aguilar, Jude Christian 
14 Gay, John Eugenio 
15 Magalaman, Joshua 
16 Novillo, Evander

Arellano Chiefs
Head Coach: Sherwin Meneses

1 Encila, Ivan 
2 Guinto, Arman Clarence 
3 Tuazon, John Marphi 
4 Curamen, Anfernee  
5 Berdal, Carl Justin 
6 Villados, Adrian 
7 Lapuz, Demy Freedom 
8 Cabillan, Jethro Jasper  (c)
9 Saksena, Ismael 
10 Delos Santos, James Paul 
11 Datu, Joshua 
12 Caunan, Christopher Mark 
13 Tan, Kim Vincent 
14 Domingo, Ralph 
15 Dela Paz, Christian 
16 Orpilla, Exequel 
17 Aure, Dan Mapy 
18 Bustillo, Melchor

Benilde Blazers
Head Coach: Ajian Dy

1 Fajardo, Jericho Paolo 
2 Adviento, Roniey 
3 Tero, John Carlo 
5 Daculan, Ryan 
6 Valera, Reiven Kyle 
7 Aguilar, Arnel Christian 
8 Jordan, Gio Ronald 
11 Gabuyan, Baron 
12 Montimor, Deon Fitzgerald 
13 Dumaran, Bryan 
15 Guani, Georgie 
16 Gomez, Alvin Bryle 
17 Laguit James Paul 
 Colesio, Harold 
 Ilano, Diego Felipe

De La Salle Green Spikers
Head Coach: Arnold Laniog

1 Ronquillo, John Mark 
2 Javier, Joaquin Antonio 
3 Anima, Billi Jean-Henri 
4 Sumalinog, John Raphael 
5 Marata, Von 
6 Guerrero, Menard 
7 Encarnacion, Simon Joseph 
8 Poquita III, Diogenes 
9 Kampton, Noel Michael 
10 Espejo, Andre 
11 Rodriguez, Joshua Jamiel 
13 Del Pilar, Nathaniel 
14 Maglinao, Vince Gerard  (c)
15 Layug, Eric Paolo 
16 De Jesus, Jules Carlo

NU Bulldogs
Head Coach: Dante Alinsunurin

1 Almendras, Angelo Nicolas 
2 Belostrino, Clarenz 
5 Ramones, Kyle Adrien 
6 Buddin, Michaelo 
8 Sumagui, Jann Mariano 
9 Lumanlan, Louis 
10 Mukaba, Obed 
11 Malinis, Kennry 
13 Retamar, Ave Joshua  (c)
15 Maclang, Marco Ely 
18 Aringo, Leo JR 
20 Bello, Joseph Phillip 
22 Fortuna, Michael Jhon 
23 Diao, Jenngerard Arnfranz

UST Tiger Spikers
Head Coach: Arthur Alan Mamon

1 De Vega, Rey Miguel 
2 Borra, Lawrence 
3 Magpayo, Charlee 
4 Taman, Abdul Aziz 
5 Cruz, Lorence  (c)
6 Dedoroy, John Emmanuel 
7 Yambao, Dux Euan 
8 Señoron, Jhun Lorenz 
9 Avila, Joshua 
10 Flor, Rainier 
11 Umandal, Joshua 
12 Sison, Rayven Camerone 
13 Ybañez, Josh 
14 Tajanlangit, Jesse Emmanuel 
15 Umandal, Sherwin 
16 Colinares, Edlyn Paul 
18 Prudenciado, Van Tracy 
21 Gupiteo, Alche 
23 Kassouin, Patrick 
24 Dela Noche, Jay Rack

Pool B

Ateneo Blue Eagles
Head Coach: Timothy Sto. Tomas Jr.

1 Magadia, Lawrence Gil 
2 Crisostomo, Leinuel 
4 Gopio, Jettlee 
5 Batas, Kennedy 
6 Taneo, Lutrelle Andre 
7 Licauco, James Daniel 
8 Pacinio, Amil Jr. 
10 Trinidad, Paulo Lorenzo 
11 Llenos, Canciano 
13 De Castro, Lance Andrei  (c)
14 Go, Emmanuel 
16 Almadro, Andrei John 
17 Sendon, Jeric 
18 Salarzon, Jian Matthew 
19 Sy, Justin Jacob 
21 Blomstedt, Kalle Johann Lennart 
22 Absin, Charles David

FEU Tamaraws
Head Coach: Rey Diaz

1 DOMINGO, Herald 
2 CODILLA, Jomel 
3 CACAO, Ariel 
4 DE GUZMAN, Raymond Bryce 
6 CALADO, Mark Frederick 
7 JAVELONA, Jose Magdalino 
8 SABANAL, Reymond 
9 SAAVEDRA, Zhydryx 
10 BANAC, Mabel Jesus 
12 MENESES, Victor 
13 SABADO, Mark Vergel 
14 MARTINEZ, Benny 
16 ABUNIAWAN, Jefferson 
23 RACAZA, France Lander

Perpetual Altas
Head Coach: Sinfronio Acaylar

1 TEODORO, Arianne Paul 
2 MATEO, Klint Michael 
3 ENGAY, Renz 
4 ZARENO, Joshua 
5 MEDALLA, Michael 
6 ANDRADE, Kc 
7 COLANGO, Emman 
8 BAGGAYAN, Jay Rick 
9 CODENIERA, Sean Archer Noel 
10 RAMIREZ, Leo 
11 ENARCISO, John Christian 
12 LITUANIA, John Exequiel 
13 GELOGO, Kylle Andre 
14 RAMIREZ, Louie 
15 SIMANGAN, Bryle
16 ROSOS, Kirth Patrick 
18 PEPITO, John Philip 
19 AUSTRIA, Hero

San Beda Red Spikers
Head Coach: Ariel dela Cruz

2 UMALI, John Frederico 
3 CALAYAG, Lorenz 
4 BOOK, Axel Van 
5 BAKIL, Andrie 
6 LOPEZ, Jerome  (c)
7 MUNSING, Alener Grieg /
9 UMALI, Kenrod Benedict 
10 CABALSA, Ralp 
13 MONTEMAYOR, Mark Kevin 
14 RUS, Aidjien Josh 
15 BUHAY, Jiacomo Ken 
16 TAHILUDDIN, Mohammad Shaif Ali 
17 LABRADOR, Sean Andrie Jeremy 
18 ROSMAN, Ryan 
21 MILJANI, Alsenal

San Sebastian Stags
Head Coach: Norvie Laubga	

1 MARTIN, Marc Dominic 
2 BIHAG, Marvin John 
3 CAGANG, Jerick 
4 ARAÑO, Jan Kerk 
5 VILLAMOR, Kyle Angelo 
6 ABULENCIA, Angelo 
7 MENDOZA, Mikel Rovin  (c)
8 YAPE, Lheann Andrei 
9 LEAL, Lorenzo Miguel 
10 MARCOS, Jezreel Franz 
11 ESPENIDA, Joshua 
12 DUGUEN, Jilbert 
13 BINONDO, Frants Einstene Aaron 
18 LIM, Cedric Resty 
21 ALBA, Rhenmart Christian

UP Fighting Maroons
Head Coach: Rald Ricafort

1 IJIRAN, Ruskin Joss 
2 GAMBAN, Louis Gaspar  (c)
4 CORDERO, Dominic Ronald 
5 NICOLAS, Daniel 
7 VELASQUEZ, Redhen Jade 
8 LAURETA, Shem Lois 
9 LAGANDO, Angelo 
10 ALBA, Angelu Leonard 
11 EUSEBIO, Erl Klint 
12 CAJOLO, Ranz Wesley 
13 ADVINCULA, Emmanuel Izus 
14 JUNTILLA, Johnlee 
15 MALABANAN, Jaivee 
16 CHAVEZ, Brian 
17 SAMANIEGO, Gian Carlo 
19 TUQUERO, Neuford 
21 LIPATA, Angelo 
22 SANTIAGO, Clarence 
23 MERCADO, Jairo Israel 
24 CHENILLA, Ravanne Zhimond

Women's division

Pool A

Adamson Lady Falcons
Head Coach: Jerry Yee

2 LAZO, Cae Jelean 
4 ALCANTARA, Angelica 
6 NUIQUE, May Ann 
7 ROMERO, Louie  (c)
8 ADOLFO, Antonette 
9 SANTIAGO, Kate Nhorrylle
10 VERDEFLOR, Ma. Joahna Karen 
11 CRUZ, Rizza Andrea 
12 TUBU, Trisha Gayle 
13 TAGSIP, Aprylle Ckyle 
15 JUEGOS, Ayesha Tara 
16 LALONGISIP, Ma. Rochelle 
17 ALMONTE, Lucille May 
18 TORING, Lorene Grace

Ateneo Blue Eagles
Head Coach: Oliver Almadro

1 HORA, Gena 
3 CANE, Jana 
4 LICAUCO, Jean 
5 GANDLER, Vanessa 
6 KOWALSKI, Makana 
7 CRUZ, Kiara 
8 SULIT, Yvana 
9 FUJIMOTO, Takako 
11 TSUNASHIMA, Geezel 
12 NARIT, Joan 
14 MINER, Alexis 
15 ILDEFONSO, Sofia /
16 DE GUZMAN, Lyann /
17 NISPEROS, Faith Shirley  (c)
18 LOMOSCO, Beautiliza 
19 DORORMAL, Roma Mae 
20 NG, Briana 
21 BUENA, Sophia /
24 NISPEROS, Ysabelle

FEU Lady Tamaraws
Head Coach: Cristina Salak

1 ZERNA, Shianly Colyn 
2 KISEO, Shiela Mae /
4 FERNANDEZ, Jovelyn 
5 UBALDO, Christine  (c)
6 JUANGCO, Alexandra Maxine 
7 ASIS, Ann Roselle 
8 GUZMAN, Angelica Blue 
9 TAGAOD, Chenie 
10 PAPA, Florize Anne 
11 GALLO, Gillianne Heinz 
12 SAPIENZA, Maria Ysabella Francesca 
13 DEVOSORA, Alyzza Gaile 
14 FAMULAGAN, Keshia Marie 
16 TRUZ, Karyme Isabella 
17 JAMILI, Jimy Jean 
18 PANANGIN, Mitzi 
19 ASIS, Jean 
20 MONARES, Julianne 
22 ENCARNACION, Margarett Louise 
23 REFUGIA, Maria Isabelle

San Sebastian Lady Stags
Head Coach: Rogelio Gorayeb

1 SANTOS, Katherina 
2 CAÑETE, Reyann 
3 BERMILLO, Jewelle 
4 MARASIGAN, Christina 
5 RAMOS, Carmella Juiliann 
6 TAN, Roxanne
7 DOMINGO, Jasmyn 
8 DIONISIO, Kristine Joy 
9 SISON, Alexia Vea 
10 TAN, Kamille Josephine Amaka 
11 STA. MARIA, Hayvenae 
12 LUMIBAO, Jassy Lei 
14 ORDOÑA, Bianca 
15 BORJA, Clarence Claire

Pool B

Benilde Lady Blazers
Head Coach: Jerry Yee

1 BASARTE, Chenae 
2 DIZON, Cathrina 
3 GAMIT, Michelle 
4 ESTENZO, Kim Alison 
5 GETIGAN, Fiona Mae 
6 MONDEJAR, Angelika 
7 GENTAPA, Jade 
8 MONDOÑEDO, Cloanne 
9 PASCUAL, Gayle 
10 GO, Mycah 
11 AVILA, Camill 
12 APOSTOL, Corrine 
14 ESTOQUE, Wielyn 
15 MAGPATOC, Abigail 
16 CATARIG, Clydel Mae 
17 DOROG, Jessa 
18 ONDANGAN, Cristy 
19 LIMPOT, Alyzandrianne 
21 NOLASCO, Zamantha

San Beda Lady Red Spikers
Head Coach: Nemesio Gavino Jr.

 ABRAHAM, Kleineross 
 BINONDO, Aryanna 
 CASTILLO, Chynna Allyson 
 CASUGOD, Jaschryl 
 CENZON, Patricia 
 FLORES, Milcah 
 GALBADORES, Koulinne
 HABACON, Angel Mae
 HADLOCON, Rea Mae
 MOLINA, Katleya 
 PARAS, Trisha Mae 
 SALANGSANG, Francesca 
 TAYAG, Marianne 
 TAYAG, Maxinne

UP Fighting Maroons
Head Coach: Kirk Beliran

1 SOTOMIL, Marianne 
3 YTANG, Niña 
4 ALTOMEA, Remelyn 
5 VERGEIRE, Maria Celina 
6 ARCE Ethan Lainne 
7 CELIS Ma. Dannica 
8 MONARES Joan Marie 
9 BONAFE Theo Bea 
12 ENCARNACION, Jewel Hannah Ysabelle 
13 OJEDA, Kirstin Louise 
16 BUSTRILLO, Stephanie 
18 JABONETA, Irah Anika 
21 CABASAC, Kryzten Annika 
25 GOC, Abilaine Ann

UST Golden Tigresses
Head Coach: Emilio Reyes, Jr.

1 CORDORA, Kyla Elvi Dale 
2 TAPIA, Ypril Jyrhine 
3 JIMENEZ, Ysabel Jamie /
4 PEPITO, Ma. Bernadett 
5 HERNANDEZ, Imee Kim Grabriella 
6 ECALLA, Mary Christine 
7 VERNAIZ, Mary Grace 
10 VICTORIA, Camille 
11 ABBU, Athena Sopia 
12 GALDONES, Kecelyn 
14 ABELLANA, Pierre Angeli 
16 MANGULABNAN, Ma. Regina Agatha 
17 DELERIO, Janel 
22 ALBERTO, Marilla Issabel 
23 HILONGO, Maribeth 
 BACALSO, Angeli 
 CARBALLO, Ma. Cassandra Rae 
 PERDIDO, Jonna Chris

References

External links 

2022 in men's volleyball
2022 in women's volleyball